Lenny Kaye (né Kusikoff; born December 27, 1946) is an American guitarist, composer, and writer who is best known as a member of the Patti Smith Group.

Early life 
Kaye was born to Jewish parents in the Washington Heights area of upper Manhattan, New York, along the Hudson River. His father changed the family name from Kusikoff to Kaye when Lenny was 1 year old. Growing up in Queens and Brooklyn, Kaye originally began playing the accordion, but by the end of the 1950s, had dropped the instrument in favor of collecting records. His family moved to North Brunswick, New Jersey, in 1960 where Lenny attended high school, and later, college, graduating from Rutgers University in 1967, majoring in American history. He became a member of science fiction fandom and gained experience in writing, publishing his own science fiction fanzine, Obelisk, at the age of 15. His personal collection of fanzines formed the core of the Lenny Kaye Science Fiction Fanzine Library at the University of Miami. Though he majored in American history, his true vocation was musical, and it was there that he first began playing in bands, on a college mixer and fraternity circuit. His first gig, with the Vandals ("Bringing down the house with your kind of music"), was at Alpha Sigma Phi on November 7, 1964.

Career

As musician, writer, and record producer, Kaye was intimately involved with an array of artists and bands. He was a guitarist for poet/rocker Patti Smith from her band's inception in 1974, and co-authored Waylon, The Life Story of Waylon Jennings. He worked in the studio with such artists as R.E.M., James, Suzanne Vega, Jim Carroll, Soul Asylum, Kristin Hersh, and Allen Ginsberg. His seminal anthology of sixties' garage-rock, Nuggets, is widely regarded as defining the genre. You Call It Madness: The Sensuous Song of the Croon, an impressionistic study of the romantic singers of the 1930s, was published by Villard/Random House in 2004.

His uncle, songwriter Larry Kusik ("A Time For Us" from Romeo and Juliet; "Speak Softly Love" from The Godfather) took note of his lengthening hair and musical commitment, and asked him to sing on a song he'd recently penned with Ritchie Adams, once of the Fireflies ("You Were Mine"). Kaye soon found himself in Associated Recording Studios on Times Square, recording "Crazy Like A Fox", along with its flip side, "Shock Me".  The resultant 45, issued under the name of Link Cromwell, was leased to Hollywood Records, a division of Starday Records located in Nashville, Tennessee, and released in March 1966. It garnered a Newcomer Pick of the Week from Cashbox ("A rhythmic bluesy folk-rocker with a pulsating beat") and was issued in the UK as well as Australia; but failed to move in the charts. Though hardly a smash, it gave Kaye a sense of self as a musician, and inspired him to continue performing and playing. His group at the time, The Zoo, worked a college circuit ranging from New York to Pennsylvania; this early experience has been captured on a live album issued by Norton Records, Live 1966.

Moving back to the city, Kaye began writing reviews for Jazz & Pop magazine (which was edited at the time by Jim Morrison's soon-to-be wife, Patricia Kennealy Morrison); branching out to such nascent rock publications as Fusion, Crawdaddy and Rolling Stone. He became the music editor of Cavalier, a men's magazine, and would write a monthly column for them until 1975; and the New York correspondent for the British weekly, Disc. As a freelance writer, he wrote for a wide range of periodicals, including Melody Maker and Creem, and edited such publications as Rock Scene and Hit Parader throughout the 1970s.

While working at the record store Village Oldies on Bleecker Street in New York, Kaye met poet-singer Patti Smith. On February 10, 1971, he backed her at a reading at St. Mark's Church on East 10th Street opening for Gerard Malanga. When they resumed performance in November 1973, their artistic efforts bore fruit as one of the major rock bands of the 1970s. Kaye produced Patti's debut single ("Hey Joe / Piss Factory"), and performed as part of her Group throughout the decade, as reflected in four Arista albums: Horses (1975), Radio Ethiopia (1976), Easter (1978) and Wave (1979).

Following the Patti Smith Group's final performance in September 1979, Kaye joined the Jim Carroll Band, as well as fronting his own Lenny Kaye Connection. He co-produced Suzanne Vega's first two albums, including her 1987 hit single, "Luka", which was nominated for a Grammy as Record of the Year. He has been nominated three times for Grammy awards in the liner notes category for boxed sets on the sixties folk revival (Bleecker and MacDougal), white blues (Crossroads), and progressive rock (Elektrock); and in 1977, with David Dalton, co-authored "Rock 100",  a comprehensive overview of leading rock stars from the 1950s till the 1970s.

In 1995, he reunited with Patti Smith and has been a part of her band since, creating six studio albums, a retrospective, and celebrating the thirtieth anniversary release of their landmark debut album, Horses.

In 2010, Kaye contributed a solo recording for Daddy Rockin' Strong: A Tribute to Nolan Strong and the Diablos (The Wind/Norton Records). Kaye recorded a version of "I Wanna Know," a 1950s R&B ballad. He appears on and wrote one song for The Fleshtones 2011 album Brooklyn Sound Solution (Yep Roc). Also, he appeared on "Alligator Aviator Autopilot Antimatter" and "Blue" on R.E.M.'s 2011 album Collapse into Now, an album that Patti Smith also contributed to, also on "Blue" and another song, "Discoverer".

In mid-February 2018, Kaye took over the night shift on Little Steven's Underground Garage, replacing Richard Manitoba who was let go mid-January 2018.

Discography
As Link Cromwell
"Crazy Like a Fox" b/w "Shock Me" (Ork Records) 1977

Lenny Kaye Connection

 I've Got a Right (Giorno Poetry Systems, 1984) with: Paul Dugan (bass), David Donen (drums), Jan Mullaney (organ, synthesizer), Charles Roth (synthesizer), John Helfand (pedal steel)
 Daddy Rockin Strong: A Tribute to Nolan Strong & The Diablos (The Wind / Norton Records, 2010, TWR002 LP)
track: "I Wanna Know"

 "Child Bride" b/w "The Tracks of My Tears" (Mer Records 604, 1980)

See also
 List of guitarists
 Nuggets: Original Artyfacts from the First Psychedelic Era, 1965–1968

References

External links

 Official website
 
 
 Lenny Kaye

1946 births
Living people
People from Washington Heights, Manhattan
American rock guitarists
American male guitarists
American rock songwriters
American male songwriters
Record producers from New York (state)
American music journalists
American punk rock guitarists
Jewish American musicians
Jewish rock musicians
Patti Smith Group members
The Minus 5 members
Jews in punk rock
Guitarists from New York City
Rutgers University alumni
20th-century American guitarists
American male non-fiction writers
People from Brooklyn
People from Queens, New York